The 2007 Tour de San Luis was a men's road cycling race held from 23  to 28 January 2007 in Argentina. It was a multiple stage race over a prologue and five stages with a total of 625 kilometres.

Stage summary

General Classification

References
 Dewielersite report

Tour de San Luis
Tour de San Luis
Tour de San Luis
January 2007 sports events in South America